The Patriarchate of Aquileia is an archdiocese. Patriarchate of Aquileia may also refer to the:

Patria del Friuli, the state in the Holy Roman Empire that lasted between 1077 and 1445
Patriarchate of Old Aquileia, a split from the Patriarchate
Patriarchate of Grado, another split from the Patriarchate

See also
List of bishops and patriarchs of Aquileia